The Great Unknown Tour is the fourth concert tour by American recording artist, Rob Thomas. Beginning June 2015, the tour will support his third studio album, The Great Unknown. The tour will predominantly perform in the United States and Canada, with performances in theaters and amphitheaters. Thomas will also perform at music festivals during the summer.

Background
After wrapping up the 2013 tour with band Matchbox Twenty, Thomas began recording his third solo album. In spring 2014, the singer launched his third solo tour, showcasing two new songs, "I Think We Feel Good Together" and "Heaven Help Me". Later that year, Thomas announced the album title via Twitter. In March 2015, Thomas posted a video to YouTube, announcing the tour. In the video, Thomas stated he will release the single and album before the tour kick off in the summer. The singer also stated he would perform new songs from the album, alongside his solo hits and hits from his band.

Cancellations
For the first time in his solo career, Thomas had to cancel many concerts during the tour. The first was the concert in Denver, Colorado. Opening act The Plain White T's added an additional 20 minutes to their set, before the announcement was made. It was explained that Thomas suffered an allergy attack and lost his voice. He later took to Twitter to post the disappointment, along with photos of him at the doctor. Later in July, Thomas's wife Marisol required brain surgery, causing 11 shows to be cancelled. Luckily, many of the dates were able to be rescheduled, with the exception of Cincinnati and North Charleston. Lack of venue availability was given of the reasons for the dates permanent cancellation.

Opening acts
Plain White T's (North America—select dates)
Vinyl Station (North America—select dates)
Pete Murray (Australia)
American Authors (Seattle)
Darren Middleton (Pokolbin, Mount Cotton and Yarra Valley)
Shaun Black (Yarra Valley)

Setlist
The following setlist is obtained from the June 11, 2015 in Rama, Ontario, held at the Casino Rama Entertainment Centre. It does not represent all concerts during the run of the tour. 
"Give Me the Meltdown"
"Fallin' to Pieces"
"Lonely No More"
"Real World '09"
"Mockingbird"
"Trust You"
"Cradlesong"
"One Shot"
"Her Diamonds"
"Ever the Same"
"Someday"
"Fire on the Mountain"
"Hold On Forever"
"Streetcorner Symphony"
"3AM"
"Little Wonders"
"I Am an Illusion"
Encore
"...Something to Be"
"Smooth"
"This Is How a Heart Breaks"

Tour dates

Festivals and other miscellaneous performances

The concert was a part of the "UMB Big Bash"
The concert was a part of the "Red Butte Garden Outdoor Concert Series"
The concert was a part of the "Boise Music Festival"
The concert was a part of the "Ravinia Festival"
The concert was a part of the "Live at the Garden Summer Concert Series"
The concert was a part of the "Live Nation Concert Series"
This concert is a part of "Live in the Vineyard"
This concert was a part of "Santa Slam"
This concert was a part of the "Not So Silent Night"
This concert was a part of "Oh Starry Night"
This concert was a part of the "Not So Silent Night"
This concert was a part of "All Star Christmas"
This concert was a part of the "Mistletoe Show"
This concert is a part of the "Not So Silent Night"
This concert is a part of "Rock the Brazos"
This concert is a part of "On the Steps"
This concert is a part of "A Day on the Green"
This concert is a part of the "After Race Concert Series"

Cancellations and rescheduled shows

Box office score data

External links
Rob Thomas Official Website

References

Rob Thomas (musician) concert tours
2015 concert tours
2016 concert tours